Ganassi, officially the Municipality of Ganassi (Maranao: Inged a Ganassi), is a 4th class municipality in the province of Lanao del Sur, Philippines. According to the 2020 census, it has a population of 30,802 people.

The municipality used to host the 'finest example of a traditional torogan' according to Jesus T. Peralta of the National Commission for Culture and the Arts. In January 2016, a media team found that the Laguindab torogan still stands in Ganassi, though it is badly damaged. A conservation effort is needed to rehabilitate the Laguindab torogan, one of the most outstanding royal houses built in the entire Philippines.

History
Ganassi among to the Nine Princess of Unayan (e.g. in Meranau term Imoda sa ganassi Ayour so Linindingan,Andong so Macadar, etc.)

Geography

Barangays
Ganassi is politically subdivided into 32 barangays.

Climate

Demographics

Economy

Culture

Torogan Finesse
It was reported in 2015 that the town once hosted what used to be the finest example of a torogan, a huge traditional Maranao house which was the seat of power of the Maranao royalties and Maranao high officials. Unfortunately, for an undisclosed reason, the torogan was demolished by some locals. A group once campaigned for the passage of an ordinance where the architecture of all houses and buildings in Ganassi will follow the okir and the torogan style. Through it, the town would have been the first planned city whose architectural grandeur is inspired by a traditional Maranao vernacular way of building. However, due to lack of funding available, the campaign went into deaf ears.

In January 2016, the media team went to the municipality and found half of the former Laguindab Torogan of Ganassi still intact and badly needs restoration. Once restored, according to the National Commission for Culture and the Arts, the Laguindab Torogan can be declared as a National Cultural Treasure like the Kawayan torogan of Marantao. A group of people are planning to nominate the torogans of Lanao del Sur to the UNESCO World Heritage List, but the nomination is being halted as of the moment due to the lack of restoration in some torogans in the area, specifically in Ganassi. The possible nomination of the Laguindab torogan to the National Cultural Treasure list and the UNESCO list is seen to boost the tourism of the area, if the torogan is conserved properly and evaluated by the local government of Ganassi, with aid request from the National Museum or National Commission for Culture and the Arts.

References

External links
 Ganassi Profile at the DTI Cities and Municipalities Competitive Index
 [ Philippine Standard Geographic Code]
 Philippine Census Information

Municipalities of Lanao del Sur
Populated places on Lake Lanao